The Venda Sexy is an estate near Santiago, Chile that was used as a torture center by the DINA secret police during the military dictatorship of Augusto Pinochet.

Description of the estate
The house was divided in two floors and a basement and it was surrounded by a garden. The floor were in parquetry and the stairs in marble.

Initially the property of a communist family, in 1974 they fled political repression and the estate became owned by a corporation owned by Carabineros officer and DINA agent Miguel Eugenio Hernández Oyarzo, who initially used it as dormitory for DINA agents. On 1981, it was sold and the first would-be buyer, neighbours, who initially planned to lodge students and a nursery, refused after learning how the estate was used; another buyer acquired the property

Under Pinochet 
It was called Venda Sexy ("Sexy Blindfold") for the sexual abuse that the inmates suffered during the detention and the fact inmates wore blindfolds. Another name that was given to the estate was La Discothéque for the music that was played when the inmates were tortured.

According to the Valech Report, the tortures used there had a sexual character. Such tortures included rapes by wardens and nude photos;  Ingrid Olderock, Carabineros officer nicknamed the "women of the dogs", had a German shepherd named Volodia (named from Volodia Teitelboim) trained to rape female inmates. Inmates had to stay naked.

The concentration camp was used for a different purpose from that of Villa Grimaldi.

In 1974 numerous members of the leftist guerrilla group MIR were interned in the camp; from 1974 to 1981, 80 inmates, one third of them female, were held in this facility; the highest activity was in 1974.

Memorial 
On 2016, several former inmates in associations such as the Colectivo de Mujeres Sobrevivientes Siempre Resistentes ("Collective of surviving women always resisting") and the Sobrevivientes de Venda Sexy ("Survivors of Venda Sexy") asked the former facility to be made a national monument. However, it's owned by private parties who are banned from altering it, and these collectives asked the state buy it to make a memorial center.

Fiction 

 Bestia, a movie about the center

See also
Ingrid Olderock

References 

Rape
Rape in the 1970s
Zoophilia
Internment camps
Operation Condor
Political repression in Chile
Torture in Chile
Violence against women in Chile